The 1985 Trincomalee massacres refers to a series of mass murder of Tamil civilians by the Sri Lankan military and Sinhalese home guards in Trincomalee District, Sri Lanka. In a succession of events that spanned over two months, hundreds of Tamil civilians were massacred and thousands were driven out by the Sri Lankan military and Sinhalese mobs in order to colonize the area. Almost every Tamil settlement in the district was destroyed during this well-orchestrated campaign to drive out the local Tamil population. Several Tamil women were also raped. In September 1985, the entire Tamil population of Trincomalee town was displaced to forests and refugee camps in an attack that wiped out the town, including the destruction of 12 temples and a mosque.

Background

Since the 1930s, the majority Sinhalese government settled Sinhalese in the predominantly Tamil speaking Eastern province, with the explicit intention to restore what they saw as lost ancient Sinhala settlements, as well as to reduce the Tamils' claim to local autonomy. Sinhalisation of Trincomalee was seen as the key to sundering the contiguity of Tamil habitations in the North and East. Tamil nationalists viewed this as an attempt to alter the demographics of their 'traditional Tamil homeland', thus weakening the Tamils' stake in it.

During the 1983 anti-Tamil pogrom, Trincomalee was the site of anti-Tamil violence at the hands of Sinhalese sailors.

List of attacks
Following is an incomplete list containing records of only reported and known attacks based on the availability of data.

May

May 3

On May 3, 50 Tamil people will killed by the Sri Lankan military and Sinhalese mobs in Dehiwatte and Mahindapura. Tamil inhabitants of these villages were ethnically cleansed and Sinhalese settlers took their places.

May 23

The Army and the newly inducted Sinhalese home guards commenced attacks on outlying Tamil villages in the Trincomalee District, in Nilaveli on 23 May 1985 and in the Allai settlement scheme south of Mutur the next day. Eight civilians were shot dead by the Military in Nilaveli on 23.05.1985.

May 24

Sinhalese home guards from Dehiwatte killed two Tamil civilians from Kankuveli.

More than ten people from Anpuvalipuram, who had gone in search of firewood never returned home. Their bulls and carts were found later. And their deaths were attributed to the home guards or the military.

May 25

11 civilians are shot dead in Pankulam village, and houses of the residents burnt down. A father and his 12-year-old son who were travelling to visit their family in the nearby village of Kankuveli were hacked to death by the Sinhalese home guards.  Their bodies were disposed at the Kankuveli tank.

May 26

Over 40 houses and property belonging to Tamils in Echchilampattu were set on fire. Two civilians were killed. On the same day, several fishermen from the district were shot dead by the Sri Lankan Navy while they were fishing. Bodies of three fishermen were recovered.

May 27

On 27 May 1985, a bus belonging to the State bus service CTB, was stopped at 52nd Milepost in Mahindapura and 6 of its passengers and its driver Pushparaja, all Tamils, were killed in cold blood and their bodies burnt by Sinhala mobs assisted by the home guards.

May 31

On the night of 31 May a police party with home guards took away 37 Tamils from the south bank of Killiveddy.

June

June 1

Government forces and Sinhalese mobs burned down 125 houses in Kilivetti, killing 10 Tamils. 8 Tamil men and 5 Tamil women were then taken to Dehiwatte, where the men were executed and the women raped.

June 3

A bus carrying 13 Tamils was burned in Trincomalee. Mr. A. Thangathurai, a former Member of Parliament, was the only survivor and witness of the incident.

June 3 and 4 

Every single Tamil village close to a Sinhala colony in the Allai Extension Scheme was destroyed by government forces and Sinhalese mobs:

June 5

On 5 June 1985, an air force helicopter flew over Thiriyai, the surviving northernmost Tamil village in Trincomalee District, firing at residents (Amarivayal and Thennamaravady villages had been uprooted seven months earlier). Air Force personnel then came in trucks with explosives and set fire to 700 houses.  People who remained took refuge in the local school.

June 13

Nine hundred houses belonging to Tamils at Kattaiparichchan, Sampur, Chenaiyur and Muthur were burned down by government forces.

August

August 10
On 10 August 1985, the Army arrived again at Thiriyai and opened fire targeting some of the leaders, killing among 10 persons, a principal and a village headman.

September

September 9
The last of the large-scale attacks was launched on Trincomalee town itself on 9 September 1985. Under cover provided by the Army, firing from the air by the Air Force and from the sea by naval gunboats, mainly Sinhalese home guards moved in to loot, burn and to kill. 25 civilians were killed and about 1500 houses and places of worship were destroyed.

September 11
Anti-Tamil rioting continues in Trincomalee town.

September 12

A Sinhalese mob with the help of armed police burn a Tamil temple in Trincomalee town.

Notes

Sources

1985 crimes in Sri Lanka
Attacks on civilians attributed to the Sri Lanka Army
Attacks on civilians attributed to the Sri Lanka Civil Security Force
Attacks on civilians attributed to the Sri Lanka Navy
Massacres in Sri Lanka
Massacres in 1985
Mass murder of Sri Lankan Tamils
Terrorist incidents in Asia in 1985